Martin Sinclair Frankland Hood, FBA (31 January 1917 – 18 January 2021), generally known as Sinclair Hood, was a British archaeologist and academic. He was Director of the British School of Archaeology at Athens from 1954 to 1962, and led the excavations at Knossos from 1957 to 1961. He turned 100 in January 2017 and died in January 2021, two weeks short of his 104th birthday.

As the review in the American Journal of Archaeology forecast, his The Arts in Prehistoric Greece (Pelican History of Art 1978, 2nd edn. 1992), became a "standard authoritative handbook for years to come" on Aegean art.

Early life and education

He was born in Cobh, (then Queenstown, and a British naval base), Ireland, in 1917, the only child of Martin Arthur Frankland Hood (1887–1919), a lieutenant commander in the Royal Navy, and Frances Ellis, daughter of James Miller Winants, of Bayonne, New Jersey, U.S., and stepdaughter of Dr. Lucius F. Donohoe, twice-elected Mayor of Bayonne. The Hood ancestors were lowland Scots. John Hood came south in January 1660 with soldiers  accompanying General Monk's army. He did not get to London, transferring to be under the command of Colonel Thomas Fairfax, and settled in Yorkshire. His successor married a daughter of Francis Radclyffe, 1st Earl of Derwentwater. Subsequent generations of Hoods moved south, and by the early nineteenth century were landed gentry of Nettleham Hall, Lincolnshire: they had strong ecclesiastical and military traditions. His father's sister, Grace (generally known, due to her middle name, "Mary", as "Molly"), was a pioneer of archaeological textiles, and was married to the educational administrator and archaeologist John Winter Crowfoot. Lt-Cmdr Martin Hood died of natural causes after the First World War. Sinclair Hood was raised by his mother in London in an Anglo-Catholic milieu, and near the sea not far from Bude on the northern coast of Cornwall.

After Harrow, Hood studied Classics and Modern History and received a Master of Arts degree from Magdalen College, Oxford in 1938. During World War II he was a conscientious objector serving with the Civil Defence Service and Holborn Stretcher Party. At his mother's behest, he apprenticed to a Chiswick architect for a time, which Hood considered a "great help for [his] later career" in that he learned to measure and draw. After the war, in 1947, he received a Diploma in Prehistoric European Archaeology from the University of London, having been taught by Kathleen Kenyon and V. Gordon Childe. Fellow students included Leslie Grinsell and Leslie R. H. Willis; senior by a year were Nancy Sandars, Grace Simpson, and Edward Pyddoke. He learned the rigorous method of excavation and the stratigraphical approach pioneered by Mortimer Wheeler and Kathleen Kenyon, working with her in London (Southwark) and also as the last assistant of Leonard Woolley at Atchana (then in Turkey). Hood visited Greece (but not Crete) before the Second World War, and after the war was a student at the British School of Archaeology, Athens, and the British Institute of Archaeology, Ankara.

Academic career

He was assistant director of the British School of Archaeology, Athens, from 1949 to 1951, and served as director from 1954 to 1962. His work was done mostly in Greece and Turkey, but also in then Mandatory Palestine and Crete. He excavated at Emporio, Chios (1952-55 with several study sessions to 1961) and Knossos between 1957 and 1961.

In the 1960s he returned to England, settling near Oxford. He took no academic or museum positions. Early in his career he did not take a post as assistant professor at Birmingham. Later though by his own account he "was asked to put in for the job to run the Ashmolean but I decided not to go for it".

A colleague noted, "He is a prime example of a teacher who has never taught, at least in the narrower academic sense of the word. His instruction is tacit, by example; or explicit, and then informal, in the trench or the museum or over the dinner table."

Sinclair Hood's advice to aspiring archaeologists:

"Well, to think for themselves and not take anything for granted. And to look at things; to look at the originals as much as you can, and also at the countryside where things are. It is very much a matter of observation, of looking with your eyes. It is extraordinary what you may find which other people just simply haven't seen because they haven't looked or not looked thoroughly enough or in the right place. It is very much a matter of looking."

From the 1960s, Hood continued to excavate in Greece, and to write books. His contributions to academic research include The Bronze Age Palace at Knossos: Plan and Sections and the Archaeological Survey of the Knossos Area both published in 1981. He considered his major life work to be the catalogue of the Bronze Age so-called 'masons' marks' at Knossos, Crete: The Masons' Marks of Minoan Knossos, edited by Lisa Bendall and published in 2020.

Personal life
On 4 March 1957, Hood married Girton College, Cambridge-educated (MA 1949) classicist Rachel Simmons (1931–2016), whom he had met conducting the excavations at Emporio on Chios. She had previously been secretary to writer J. B. Priestley, and would later organise Adult Literacy at Thame. They had a son, Martin, and two daughters, Mary and Dictynna.

Select bibliography
For a fuller Bibliography of the Works of Sinclair Hood as published to 1994 and forthcoming from 1994 see Knossos: A Labyrinth of History, 1994,  pages xix to xxv.

General Works

 The Home of the Heroes: The Aegean before the Greeks (London, 1967)
The Minoans – Ancient Peoples and Places (Thames & Hudson Ltd 1971)
The Arts in Prehistoric Greece (Pelican History of Art 1978, 2nd edn. 1992)
Excavation Reports
Prehistoric Emporio and Ayio Gala: V. 1: Excavations in Chios, 1938–55 (British School of Archaeology, 1982)
With Cadogan, Gerald. Knossos Excavations 1957–61: Early Minoan (BSA, 2011).
Miscellaneous

 (with William Taylor) The Bronze Age Palace at Knossos: Plan and Sections (BSA Supplementary Volume 13; London 1981)
 (with David Smyth) Archaeological Survey of the Knossos Area (2nd edition revised and expanded; BSA Supplementary Volume 14; London 1981)
 The Masons' Marks of Minoan Knossos edited by Lisa Bendall (BSA Supplementary Volume 49, London 2020)

References

External links
Wright, James C. 1980. Review of The Arts in Prehistoric Greece, by Sinclair Hood. American Journal of Archaeology 84:538-539.
 British School official website
 Ambrosia search
Bibliography on WorldCat
Papers by Sinclair Hood

1917 births
2021 deaths
Alumni of Magdalen College, Oxford
British archaeologists
British centenarians
British conscientious objectors
Directors of the British School at Athens
People from Cobh
Minoan archaeologists
Civil Defence Service personnel
Men centenarians
Fellows of the British Academy